Feathered hair is a hairstyling technique that was popular in the 1970s and the early 1980s. It was designed for straight hair. The hair was layered, with either a side or a center parting. The hair would be brushed back at the sides, giving an appearance similar to the feathers of a bird.

The haircut gained phenomenal popularity in the early 1970s. Many celebrities wore this style at some time or another including Farrah Fawcett, Dorothy Hamill, Princess Diana, John Travolta and Rob Lowe.

See also
 Feather hair extensions
 List of hairstyles

References

External links
 
 Guide for Buying Hair Extensions
 

Hairstyles
1970s fashion
1980s fashion